John Davenport Sheffield (1879 – 13 March 1915) was an English amateur footballer who played in the Football League for Burton United and Leicester Fosse as an outside right.

Personal life 
Sheffield apprenticed as an architect and surveyor and as of 1911 was assisting his family in the running of the Railway Hotel, Coalville. He served as a corporal in the Leicestershire Regiment (later the Royal Leicestershire Regiment) during the Second Boer War. He later rejoined the regiment soon after the outbreak of the First World War in August 1914. On 13 March 1915, while serving with the 2nd Battalion of the regiment, Sheffield was shot in the head and killed by a sniper on the final day of the Battle of Neuve Chapelle. He is commemorated on the Le Touret Memorial.

Career statistics

References

1879 births
1915 deaths
People from Coalville
Footballers from Leicestershire
English footballers
Association football outside forwards
Coalville Albion F.C. players
Whitwick White Cross F.C. players
Coalville Town F.C. players
Burton United F.C. players
Leicester City F.C. players
Loughborough Corinthians F.C. players
Coalville Swifts F.C. players
English Football League players
British Army personnel of World War I
Royal Leicestershire Regiment soldiers
British military personnel killed in World War I
British Army personnel of the Second Boer War
Deaths by firearm in France
Military personnel from Leicestershire